Higham on the Hill railway station is a disused railway station on the former Ashby and Nuneaton Joint Railway. It served the village of Higham on the Hill. It closed in 1931 to passengers but goods continued to pass through until 1962 when the line was closed from Shenton to Nuneaton via Stoke Golding and Higham on the Hill closed. The site is now occupied by an industrial estate but the station masters house remains as a private residence.

References

http://www.shackerstonefestival.co.uk/ANJR/Hhigham_on_the_hill.htm

Disused railway stations in Leicestershire
Railway stations in Great Britain opened in 1873
Railway stations in Great Britain closed in 1931
Former London and North Western Railway stations
Former Midland Railway stations